This is a list of singles that have peaked in the top 10 of the French Singles Chart in 2023.

Top 10 singles

Key

See also
2023 in music
List of number-one hits of 2023 (France)

References

Top
France top 10
Top 10 singles in 2023
France 2023